Kong Zongyuan (courtesy name 子莊) was a 46th generation descendant of Confucius and the first Duke Yansheng.

When Kong Shengyou (孔聖佑) died without a son, Kong Zongyuan succeeded him as Duke Wenxuan (文宣公) in 1039. In 1055, Emperor Renzong of Song renamed the title to Duke Yansheng (衍聖公).
Descendants of Kong Zongyuan continued to hold the title of Duke Yansheng until 1935.

Kong Zongyuan is buried in the Cemetery of Confucius in Qufu.

See also  
Family tree of Confucius in the main line of descent

References 

Chinese nobility
Descendants of Confucius
Year of birth unknown
Year of death unknown
Song dynasty people
11th-century Chinese people